Reiko Sakamoto is a former international table tennis player from Japan.

Table tennis career
She won a silver medal at the 1971 World Table Tennis Championships in the women's doubles with Mieko Hirano.

She also won an Asian Championship medal.

See also
 List of table tennis players
 List of World Table Tennis Championships medalists

References

Japanese female table tennis players
World Table Tennis Championships medalists
Living people
Year of birth missing (living people)